Ballygarvan is a village in County Cork, Ireland. It lies 9km south of Cork City.

The village had a population of 556 inhabitants as of the 2016 census. Occupying the eastern half of Ballinhassig parish, the village lies in the valley between Myrtle Hill and Meadstown Hill, beside the River Owenabue. The village is just off the Cork-Kinsale road with Cork City 9 km to the north. Cork Airport is located 2 km away in the Farmers Cross area.

Facilities in Ballygarvan include a church, a primary school, a public house, a hairdresser, and a creche. The village has a GAA club and playing pitch.

Ballygarvan GAA club won the Cork Junior Hurling Championship in 2004 and 2014. In 1921 the village school was burned down by British forces following an IRA ambush in nearby Ballinhassig.

Notable local residents have included GAA patron Liam MacCarthy (after whom the Liam MacCarthy Cup is named), Cork footballer Ger Spillane, hurler Stephen White and camogie player Emer Dillon.

See also
 List of towns and villages in Ireland

References

Towns and villages in County Cork